Blastocladia arborata is a species of fungus.

External links
 

Blastocladiomycota
Fungi described in 1988